In mathematics, the definite integral

is the area of the region in the xy-plane bounded by the graph of f, the x-axis, and the lines x = a and x = b, such that area above the x-axis adds to the total, and that below the x-axis subtracts from the total.

The fundamental theorem of calculus establishes the relationship between indefinite and definite integrals and introduces a technique for evaluating definite integrals.

If the interval is infinite the definite integral is called an improper integral and defined by using appropriate limiting procedures. for example:

A constant, such pi, that may be defined by the integral of an algebraic function over an algebraic domain is known as a period.

The following is a list of some of the most common or interesting definite integrals. For a list of indefinite integrals see List of indefinite integrals.

Definite integrals involving rational or irrational expressions

Definite integrals involving trigonometric functions

     (see Dirichlet integral)

Definite integrals involving exponential functions

   (see also Gamma function)
 
 
 
 
  (the Gaussian integral)
 
 
 
 
 
  (where !! is the double factorial)
 
 
 
 
 
 
 
 
 
  (where  is Euler–Mascheroni constant)

Definite integrals involving logarithmic functions

Definite integrals involving hyperbolic functions

Frullani integrals

See also 

 List of integrals
 Indefinite sum
 Gamma function
 List of limits

References
 
 
 
 

Integrals
Integrals